The 1946 Miami Hurricanes football team was an American football team that represented the University of Miami as an independent during the 1946 college football season. In their eighth year under head coach Jack Harding, the Hurricanes compiled an 8–2 record and outscored opponents by a total of 200 to 147. They played their home games at Burdine Stadium in Miami.

The November 29 game was originally scheduled to be against Penn State. That game was cancelled in early November by unanimous vote of the Penn State team. Miami officials felt that Penn State fielding their African American players Wallace Triplett and Dennis Hoggard in Miami could have led to "unfortunate incidents", and the team chose to cancel the game rather than playing without Triplett and Hoggard. Miami reportedly invited Syracuse to replace Penn State. This invitation was promptly declined and rebuked in an editorial in The Daily Orange, titled "No Thanks, Miami". Detroit was added to the schedule in replacement of Penn State in mid-November.

Schedule

After the season

The 1947 NFL Draft was held on December 16, 1946. The following Hurricanes were selected.

References

Miami
Miami Hurricanes football seasons
Miami Hurricanes football